Kanybek Zholchubekov (born 8 October 1989) is a Kyrgyzstani Greco-Roman wrestler. He won the silver medal in the men's 60 kg event at the 2018 Asian Games held in Jakarta, Indonesia.

In 2019, he competed in the 60 kg event at the World Wrestling Championships held in Nur-Sultan, Kazakhstan.

Achievements

References

External links 
 

Living people
1989 births
Place of birth missing (living people)
Kyrgyzstani male sport wrestlers
Wrestlers at the 2010 Asian Games
Wrestlers at the 2014 Asian Games
Wrestlers at the 2018 Asian Games
Asian Games medalists in wrestling
Asian Games silver medalists for Kyrgyzstan
Medalists at the 2010 Asian Games
Medalists at the 2018 Asian Games
Islamic Solidarity Games medalists in wrestling
Islamic Solidarity Games competitors for Kyrgyzstan
21st-century Kyrgyzstani people